Grayson House may refer to:

Grayson House (Fort Necessity, Louisiana), listed on the National Register of Historic Places in Franklin Parish, Louisiana
Grayson House (Monroe, Louisiana), listed on the National Register of Historic Places in Ouachita Parish, Louisiana
Dr. C. S. Grayson House, High Point, North Carolina, listed on the National Register of Historic Places  in Guilford County, North Carolina
John Grayson House, Graysontown, Virginia, NRHP-listed
Grayson-Gravely House, Graysontown, Virginia, NRHP-listed